Ringiste is a settlement in Valga Parish, Valga County in southeastern Estonia.

An area in Ringiste is called Nakatu.

References

Villages in Valga County